Giorgi Margvelashvili (born 9 February 1990) is a Georgian chess player who earned the grandmaster title in 2010.

References 
 

1990 births
Living people 
Chess grandmasters
Chess players from Georgia (country)
Place of birth missing (living people)
21st-century people from Georgia (country)